Felicjan Filip Wołodkowicz (6 June 1698 – 12 February 1778) was the "Metropolitan of Kiev, Galicia and all Ruthenia"

On 1731 Wolodkowicz was ordained by Primate of the Uniate church Athanasius Szeptycki as a bishop of Chełm.

On 22 November 1758 Wolodkowicz was appointed a bishop of Volodymyr and Brest.

On 18 July 1762 he was confirmed as the Metropolitan bishop of Kyiv, Galicia, and all Ruthenia.

He consecrated following bishops Athanasius Szeptycki, Heraclius Lisanski, Cyprian Stecki, and Patriarch Giorgio Maria Lascaris.

Hrebnicki died in 1762 at a residence of the Polotsk Archbishops that he built in village of Strunie (today in Polotsk District).

Notelist

References 
 Philip Wolodkowicz at the catholic-hierarchy.org
 Dzyuba, O. Philip Wolodkowicz (ВОЛОДКОВИЧ ПИЛИП). Encyclopedia of History of Ukraine. 2003

1698 births
1778 deaths
People from Vilnius Voivodeship
Ruthenian nobility of the Polish–Lithuanian Commonwealth
Metropolitans of Kiev, Galicia and all Ruthenia (Holy See)
Order of Saint Basil the Great